Camp Clearfork is a group use recreational facility in Ouachita National Forest, west of the city of Hot Springs, Arkansas.  It is located at the end of Camp Clearfork Trail, south of United States Route 270.  The camp was developed in the 1930s by the Civilian Conservation Corps (CCC), and includes cabins, a recreation hall, and Camp Clearfork Reservoir, impounded by a CCC-built dam.

The camp was listed on the National Register of Historic Places in 1993.

See also
National Register of Historic Places listings in Garland County, Arkansas

References

External links

Camp Clearfork web site

Buildings and structures completed in 1935
Buildings and structures in Garland County, Arkansas
Ouachita National Forest
Historic districts on the National Register of Historic Places in Arkansas
National Register of Historic Places in Garland County, Arkansas
1935 establishments in Arkansas